The Cutch Agency  was one of the agencies of British India.

The agency's headquarters were at Bhuj, where the Political Agent used to reside. He reported to the Political Department office at Bombay, Bombay Presidency.

History
The agency was formed in 1819 when Cutch State became a British protectorate.

Captain James MacMurdo was first appointed Political Agent, as Collector and Resident of Cutch. He worked from his office

The progressive prosperity of Cutch was devastated by the famine of 1899-1900, which was felt everywhere with extreme severity; between 1891 and 1901 the population of the state of Cutch decreased from 558,415 inhabitants in 1891 to 488,022 in 1901, owing to the famine.

On 10 October 1924 the Cutch Agency was abolished and merged into the Western India States Agency.

See also 

 History of Tharparkar

References

Agencies of British India
History of Gujarat
1924 disestablishments in India
1819 establishments in India
History of Kutch